Dickert is a German surname. Notable people with the surname include:

 Jake Dickert (born 1983), American college football coach 
John Dickert (born 1962), American politician 
 Julius Dickert (1816–1896), German teacher and politician
 Wayne Dickert (born 1958), American slalom canoer

See also
 Dicker (surname)

German-language surnames
Surnames of German origin